Theodoxus meridionalis is a species of freshwater snail with a gill and an operculum. It is an aquatic gastropod mollusk in the family Neritidae, the nerites.

Distribution 
The distribution of this species includes Sicily (which is part of Italy), and north-western Tunisia.

The type locality is Syracuse, Sicily.

Description
The shell is cone-shaped to half-egg-shaped, almost smooth and weakly shiny. The color is pale yellowish with dark red to blackish zigzag streaks.

Dimensions of the shell are 4-5 × 7-8 mm.

Ecology
This small snail lives in cold running waters.

References
This article incorporates public domain text from the reference

Neritidae
Gastropods described in 1836